Farrea is a genus of glass sponges in the family Farreidae.

Species
Species accepted by the World Register of Marine Species:
 Farrea aleutiana Reiswig & Stone, 2013
 Farrea ananchorata Reiswig & Kelly, 2011
 Farrea anoxyhexastera Reiswig & Kelly, 2011
 Farrea aspondyla Reiswig & Stone, 2013
 Farrea balaguerii de Linares, 1887
 Farrea beringiana Okada, 1932
 Farrea bowerbanki Boury-Esnault, Vacelet & Chevaldonné, 2017
 Farrea campossinus Lopes, Hajdu & Reiswig, 2011
 Farrea convolvulus Schulze, 1899
 Farrea cordelli Reiswig, 2020
 Farrea densa Carter, 1873
 Farrea foliascens Topsent, 1906
 Farrea hanitschi Ijima, 1927
 Farrea herdendorfi Duplessis & Reiswig, 2004
 Farrea hieroglyphica Tabachnick & Fromont, 2019
 Farrea kurilensis Okada, 1932
 Farrea laminaris Topsent, 1904
 Farrea lendenfeldi Ijima, 1927
 Farrea medusiforma Reiswig & Kelly, 2011
 Farrea mexicana Wilson, 1904
 Farrea microclavula Tabachnick, 1988
 Farrea nodulosa Ijima, 1927
 Farrea occa Bowerbank, 1862
 Farrea omniclavata Reiswig, 2014
 Farrea onychohexastera Reiswig & Kelly, 2011
 Farrea raoulensis Reiswig & Kelly, 2011
 Farrea ritchieae Tabachnick & Fromont, 2019
 Farrea schulzei Reiswig, 2018
 Farrea seiri Duplessis & Reiswig, 2004
 Farrea similaris Reiswig & Kelly, 2011
 Farrea sollasii Schulze, 1886
 Farrea spirifera Ijima, 1927
 Farrea truncata Reiswig, 2014
 Farrea vosmaeri Schulze, 1886
 Farrea watasei Okada, 1932
 Farrea weltneri Topsent, 1901
 Farrea woodwardi  (Kent, 1870)

References

Hexactinellida
Hexactinellida genera